This article lists songs about Stockholm, set there, or named after a location or feature of the city.

It is not intended to include songs where Stockholm is simply "name-checked" along with various other cities.

List
"19Hundra80Sju" by Imperiet
"Ah Stockholm" by Marty Willson-Piper
"Attention, Stockholm!" by Virna Lindt
"Bajen" by Kenta Gustafsson
"Balladen om det stora slagsmålet på Tegelbacken" by Olle Adolphson 
"Balladen om eken" by Fred Åkerström 
"Balladen om en gammal knarkare" by Thåström 
"Columbus" by Kent 
"Där har du grabben som har greppet direkt" by Sigge Fürst 
"De e knas" by The Latin Kings 
"Du & Jag & Stockholm" by Plura Jonsson 
"Ekenskisen" by Lasse Dahlquist 
"En vacker död stad" by Thåström 
"Estocolmo" by  Dj Méndez 
"Ett enkelt rum på Sabbatsberg" by John Holm  
"Fotbollsjazzen" by Elof Ahrle 
"Från Djursholm till Danvikstull" by Orup 
"Från Söder har Stockholm fått färgen" by Carl Anton 
"Fredrik Snortare & Cecilia Synd" by Petter 
"Fröken Gull ifrån Skanstull" by Johnny Bode 
"Fulla för kärlekens skull" by Eldkvarn 
"Gustav Lindströms visa" by Olle Adolphson 
"Hammarbysången" by Plura 
"Har du vart i Stockholm?" by Dungen 
"Hem till Stockholm stad" by Svante Thuresson feat. Mats Ronander
"Höghus, låghus, dårhus" by Imperiet 
"Huddinge, Huddinge" by Hoola Bandoola Band 
"Huddinge, Tullinge, Tumba..." by Magnus Härenstam 
"Hum, hum från Humlegården" by Ragnar Borgedahl
"I Stockholm" by Lars Winnerbäck 
"Into the Light" by Weeping Willows 
"Jag kommer i kväll under balkongen" by Karl Wehle 
"Jitterbug från Söder" by Alice Babs 
"Just idag är jag stark" by Kenta Gustafsson
"Just idag är jag stark" by Plura
"Klarabergsviadukten" by Lorentz & Sakarias
"Kontroll i Stockholm" by Imperiet 
"Kungsholmsloppet" by Eldkvarn 
"Mamma Pappa Barn" by Ebba Grön 
"Måne över Stureplan" by Monica Zetterlund 
""Meet me in Stockholm" by Sir Douglas Quintet
"Mina drömmars stad" by Jigs 
"Miss Huddinge -72" by Thåström 
"Mona Tumbas Slim Club" by Ebba Grön 
"När luffarna slipper att vandra" by Åsa Jinder 
"Odenplan Sthlm" by Mange Schmidt
"O' Stockholm" by Marty Willson-Piper
"På min mammas gata" by Lennart Skoglund 
"Packad i Stockholm (igen)" by Svensk Pop 
"Peace and Love i Sthlm City" by Stefan Sundström 
"Please Come Home to Hamngatan" by The Mountain Goats
"Pokerkväll i Vårby Gård" by Florence Valentin 
"Sakta vi gå genom stan" by Monica Zetterlund 
"Söderjäntans lördag" by Åke Söderblom 
"Söders kors" by Eldkvarn 
"Solna" by Titiyo
"Somewhere In Stockholm" by Avicii
"Somliga går med trasiga skor" by Eldkvarn 
"Sommar i Stockholm" by Mauro Scocco 
"Sommarbarn" by Eva Dahlgren 
"Stenad i Stockholm" by Perssons Pack (feat. Annika Norlin)
"Sthlm City" by Ken Ring 
"Sthlm kallar" by Bruket 
"Sthlm, Sthlm" by Olle Ljungström 
"Stockholm" by Mattias Alkberg BD
"Stockholm" by Jean-Louis Aubert
"Stockholm" by Euroboys 
"Stockholm" by Jason Isbell 
"Stockholm" by Kenta Gustafsson
"Stockholm" by Ludvig Käll
"Stockholm" by New Fast Automatic Daffodils 
"Stockholm" by Orup 
"Stockholm" by Pugh Rogefeldt 
"Stockholm Calling" by Sophia Somajo 
"Stockholm City (Live '98)" by Ulf Lundell 
"Stockholm i mitt hjärta" by Lasse Berghagen 
"Stockholm i mitt hjärta" by Petter 
"Stockholm i natt" by Peter Jöback
"Stockholm i strålande väder" by Carl Johan Vallgren 
"Stockholm serenad" by Lorentz & M.Sakarias 
"Stockholm Syndrome" by Muse
"Stockholm Syndrome" by One Direction
"Stockholm, sett snett uppifran" by Vapnet 
"Stockholms kyss" by Lars Winnerbäck 
"Stockholms pärlor" by Ebba Grön 
"Stockholms ström" by Aston Reymers Rivaler
"Stockholmsmelodi" by Sven-Bertil Taube 
"Stockholmsserenad" by Adolphson och Falk
"Stockholmsungar" by Kalle Nämndeman 
"Stolta stad" by Fred Åkerström 
"They Are Stone Swallowers" by The Mountain Goats
"Tjockhult" by Dag Vag 
"Tre gringos" by Just D 
"Världens bästa Karlsson" by Georg Wadenius 
"Vatten" by Robert Broberg 
"Vi hänger me'" by Nacka Skoglund 
"Vinden har vänt" by Petter
"We’re Only In It for the Drugs No. 1" by Ebba Grön
"Zealots of Stockholm" by Childish Gambino

References

Stockholm
Music in Stockholm
Songs